Clara Maass Medical Center is a 342- bed hospital in Belleville, Essex County, New Jersey, United States, that is part of the RWJBarnabas Health.  It was founded in 1868 as the Newark German Hospital, and was renamed in 1952 in honor of Clara Maass, a former nurse who trained there at the hospital's Christina Trefz Training School for Nurses, and become the hospital's head nurse. Maass' 1901 death during yellow fever experiments attracted national attention.

In 1956 a new building was completed in Belleville, which is sometimes referred to as "The Hospital in the Park" due to its location opposite Branch Brook Park. In 2022, the hospital was staffed by over 700 physicians with 2,100 total employees.

Notes

External links
 Official website
 Guide to the Clara Maass Memorial Hospital Collection, New Jersey Historical Society in Newark, NJ

Hospital buildings completed in 1868
1868 establishments in New Jersey
Belleville, New Jersey
Hospitals in New Jersey
Hospitals established in 1868
Hospitals in Essex County, New Jersey